Mireia Martínez (born 21 April 2005) is a Spanish rhythmic gymnast. She's the bronze All-Around and 5 hoops medalist at the 2022 World Championships.

Personal life 
She took up the sport at age four in La Pobla de Vallbona, she came to this sport by chance when walking at the sports complex in her hometown and she saw some girls practising rhythmic gymnastics. Her dream is to compete at the 2024 Olympic Games in Paris.

Career 
She trains twice a day at the High Performance Centre (CAR) in Madrid. In 2021 Martínez participated in the World Championships along Inés Bergua , Ana Gayan, Valeria Márquez, Uma Mendez and Patricia Pérez, finishing 12th in the All-Around and 5th in the 3 hoops + 4 clubs' final.

The group debuted in 2022 at the World Cup in Sofia, they were 5th in the All-Around and 5 hoops and 6th with 3 ribbons + 2 balls. In Baku they were 12th in the All-Around and therefore didn't qualify for event finals. A month later in Pamplona they won bronze in the All-Around and silver with 5 hoops. In Portimão they won 3 silver medals. They won All-Around bronze and 5 hoops and silver with 3 ribbons + 2 balls in Cluj-Napoca. Mireia took part, with Ana Arnau, Inés Bergua, Valeria Márquez, Patricia Pérez and Salma Solaun in the 2022 European Championships in Tel Aviv, winning silver in the 3 ribbons + 2 balls final, and the World Championships in Sofia where the Spanish group won three bronze medals: All-Around (earning them a spot for the 2024 Olympics), 5 hoops, and team.

References 

2005 births
Living people
Spanish rhythmic gymnasts
Medalists at the Rhythmic Gymnastics European Championships
Medalists at the Rhythmic Gymnastics World Championships